Malouetine is an aminosteroid neuromuscular blocking agent and antinicotinic alkaloid isolated from Malouetia spp.

The structure of malouetine inspired the development of modern aminosteroid muscle relaxants such as pancuronium bromide and vecuronium bromide by workers at Organon.

References

Nicotinic antagonists
Steroidal alkaloids
Alkaloids found in Apocynaceae
Neuromuscular blockers
Quaternary ammonium compounds